The community of Chinese people in Italy has grown rapidly in the past ten years. Official statistics indicate there are at least 330,495 Chinese citizens in Italy, although these figures do not account for former Chinese citizens who have acquired Italian nationality or Italian-born people of Chinese descent.

Demographics
Prato, Tuscany has the largest concentration of Chinese people in Italy and all of Europe. It has the second largest population of Chinese people overall in Italy after Milan.

Religion

In total, approximately one quarter of the Chinese community was classified as belonging to the Chinese (folk) religion. The surveyors weren't able to determine a precise Taoist identity; only 1.1% of the surveyed people identified as such, and the analysts preferred to consider Taoism as an "affluent" of the Chinese religion. The survey found that 39.9% of the Chinese had a thoroughly atheist identity, not believing in any god, nor belonging to any religious organisation, nor practicing any religious activity.

The study also analysed the Chinese Christian community, finding it comprised 8% of the total population (of which 3.6% were Catholics, 3.3% Protestants and 1.1% Jehovah's Witnesses). The Christian community was small, but larger than that of the province of origin, especially for the Catholics and the Jehovah's Witnesses, the latter being an illegal religion in China. Protestants were found to be basically nondenominational and largely (70%) women.

In the years 2011 and 2012 the ISTAT made a survey regarding the religious affiliation among the immigrants in Italy, the religion of the Chinese people in Italy were as follows:
 Non religious: 44.5%
 Buddhists: 44.4%
 Christians: 7.3%
 Other religions: 3.8%

Community relations
In 2007, several dozen protesters took to the streets in Milan over alleged discrimination. The northern Italian town of Treviso also ordered Chinese-run businesses to take down their lanterns because they looked "too oriental".

Cities with significant Chinese communities

Based on Demo ISTAT statistics.

Milan 18,918 (1.43% on total resident population)
Rome 12,013
Prato 11,882 (6.32%)
Turin 5,437
Florence 3,890 (1.05%)
Campi Bisenzio 3,018 (6.87%)
Reggio Emilia 2,925 (1.72%)
Bologna 2,654
Naples 2,456
Brescia 2,394 (1.23%)
Venice 2,163
Empoli 1,759 (3.67%)
Genoa 1,637
Forlì 1,607 (1.36%)
Padua 1,571
Fucecchio 1,502 (6.39%)

The city of Prato has the second largest Chinese immigrant population in Italy (after Milan with Italy's largest Chinatown). Legal Chinese residents in Prato on 31 December 2008 were 9,927. Local authorities estimate the number of Chinese citizens living in Prato to be around 45,000, illegal immigrants included. Most overseas Chinese come from the city of Wenzhou in the province of Zhejiang, some of them having moved from the Chinatown in Paris.
In 2021 there were 33871 (2,466%) chinese in Milan and 33649 (16,764%) in prato

Notable people

References

Further reading 
 (Archive)
 Luigi Berzano, Carlo Genova, Massimo Introvigne, Roberta Ricucci, Pierluigi Zoccatelli. Cinesi a Torino: la crescita di un arcipelago. Il Mulino, 2010. .

External links 
SPIEGEL Magazine Article about the Chinese in Prato  September 7, 2006

Italy, Chinese people in
Italy
Ethnic groups in Italy
Asian diaspora in Italy
 
China–Italy relations